Gaius Fonteius Capito may refer to:

 Gaius Fonteius Capito (suffect consul 33 BC), suffect consul of 33 BC, father of the consul of AD 12, and grandfather of the consul of AD 59.
 Gaius Fonteius Capito (consul AD 12), consul of AD 12, son of the suffect consul of 33 BC, and father of the consul of AD 59.
 Gaius Fonteius Capito (consul 59), consul of AD 59 and son of the consul of AD 12.